North Gauhati College, established in 1962, is one of the oldest degree colleges situated in Guwahati, Assam. This college is affiliated with the Gauhati University. The College was then (in the year 1962) one and only higher educational institute of entire Northern part of the Kamrup district. In 2012, the institute had completed 50 years of its existence and celebrated golden jubilee year.

Departments

Science
Anthropology
Botany
Chemistry
Electronics
Physics
Mathematics
Zoology

Arts
Assamese
English
History
Education
Economics
Political Science
Geography

References

External links
https://www.northgauhaticollege.org/index.php

Universities and colleges in Guwahati
Colleges affiliated to Gauhati University
Educational institutions established in 1962
1962 establishments in Assam